Straume is a surname. Notable people with the surname include:

Eilif Straume, Norwegian writer and critic
Gisle Straume, Norwegian actor and theatre director
Jānis Straume, Latvian politician
Krists Straume, Latvian sprint canoeist
Unni Straume, Norwegian film director and screenwriter
Vilnis Straume, Latvian footballer

Fictional characters:
Miles Straume, fictional character played by Ken Leung on the ABC television series Lost